Basilica of the Sacred Heart of Jesus, situated on the south boulevard of Pondicherry in Puducherry, India, is an oriental specimen of Gothic Revival architecture. It contains rare stained glass panels depicting events from the life of Christ and saints of the Catholic Church. In recent years it has become one of the famous pilgrimage spots for Christians.

History
In the year 1895, the then Archbishop Mgr.Gandy consecrated the Archdiocese of Pondicherry to the Sacred Heart of Jesus. He wished to build a new church in devotion of Sacred Heart of Jesus. Rev. Fr. Telesphore Welter, the parish priest of Nellithope prepared the building plan and parish priest of Cathedral Rev. Fr. Fourcaud commenced the construction of the new church in 1902 at the southern side of Pondicherry.

The blessing of the church and the first mass was held at the western wing of the present church by Mgr. Gandy on 17, December 1907 and the new parish surrounding this church has been established on 27, January 1908.

Centenary celebrations
The year 2008-2009 was celebrated as centenary year of founding of the parish. A special postal stamp and postal envelope were released to mark the valedictory function of the centenary celebrations.

Elevation to Basilica status

At the end of the Centenary Celebrations in June 2009, a request was placed through Telesphore Toppo, President of CBCI, to the Holy See for the elevation of this church to a Basilica.

The Holy See granted the status of minor basilica to the church, with a papal brief dated Friday 24 June 2011. This arrived on Friday 29 July 2011 to archbishops house. This was officially announced by Mgr. Antony Anandarayar, Archbishop of Pondicherry and Cuddalore on 29 July 2011. The Papal Nuncio to India, Salvatore Pennacchio (Titular Archbishop of Montemarano) visited the basilica on 2 September 2011 and officially declared the church as a basilica in the name of the holy see.
At present the basilica is headed by Rector Rev.Fr. S. Maria Joseph

Structure
This 100 years old historical church is 50 m long, 48 m wide and 18 m high with Latin rite cross shape in aerial view is in Gothic style. 24 main columns hold the structure. The biblical verse from 2 Chronicles 7:16 is written above the entrance door in Latin "sanctificavi locum istum, ut sit nomen meum ibi" which means "I have consecrated this house, that my name may be there forever. My eyes and my heart will be there forever.". Inside the church there are glass pictures of 28 saints who were related to the devotion of Sacred Heart of Jesus.

This 100-year-old church has been led by twenty parish priests. The Grotto for Our Lady of Lourdes, Parish Hall, Adoration chapel and the new parish community hall were some of the development of this church since the 1960s. After the arrival of parish priest Thomas in 2005 the church was fully renovated inside and out.

Statues of the four evangelists were erected, beneath which there are four lamp posts describing their lives and the inviting Jesus and the twelve apostles on the front facade. The Grotto for Sacred Heart of Jesus facing the City Railway Station were added and the church illuminated inside and out with chandeliers, focus and flood lights.

Mass Timings

Daily Mon-Sat Mass Timings
06.00Am - Tamil Mass
12Noon - Tamil Mass
06.00Pm - Tamil Mass

1st Friday Special
10.30Am - Adoration, Eucharistic Blessing & Tamil Mass.

Sunday Mass Timings
05.30Am - Tamil Mass
07.30Am - Tamil Mass
12Noon - Tamil Mass
05.00Pm - English Mass
06.15Pm - Tamil Mass

Night Mass Timings
11.30PM on
New Year Night Mass
Easter Night Mass
Christmas Night Mass

Leadership
The former parish priests of this church are:

Parish priests
T. Welter (1902–1909)
A. Combes (1909–1910)
A. Deniaud (1911–1917)
A. Leblanc (1917–1924)
L.C. Renoux(1925 -    )
P.M. Planat (1925–1931)
H. Gaston (1937–1945)
L. Peyroutet (1945–1947)
A. Olasail (1947–1953)
S. Valanganny (1954–1956)
M. Abel (1956–1963)
P. Irudayam (1963–1972)
G. Raja (1972–1980)
I. Gnanamanikam (1980–1982)
P. Gnanapragasam (1982–1988)
P. P. Xavier (1988–1989)
A. Mariasusai (1988–1989)
L. Maguimey (1989–1996)
G. Jacob (1996–2005)
A.Thomas (2005-2012)
S.Maria Joseph(2012–2019)
S. Kulandaisamy(2019–Present)

Rectors
A. Thomas (2005- May 2012)
S. Maria Joseph ( June 2012- June 2019)
S. Kulandaisamy ( June 2019 – present)

Gallery

References

External links

Roman Catholic churches in Puducherry
Sacred Heart of Jesus, Pondicherry
Roman Catholic churches completed in 1907
Archdiocese of Pondicherry and Cuddalore
Roman Catholic churches in Pondicherry (city)
1907 establishments in the French colonial empire
20th-century Roman Catholic church buildings in India
1907 establishments in India